Goodwin Lake is a lake in the U.S. state of Washington. 

Goodwin Lake was named after William Goodwin, a businessperson in the local lumber industry.

References

Lakes of Thurston County, Washington